The 2018 Liga 3 North Sumatra is a qualifying round for the national round of 2018 Liga 3. PSDS Deli Serdang, the winner of the 2017 Liga 3 North Sumatra are the defending champions. The competition will begin on July 1, 2018.

Format
In this competition, 28 teams are divided into 8 groups. The two best teams are through to knockout stage. The winner will represent North Sumatra in national round of 2018 Liga 3.

Teams
There are initially 28 clubs which will participate the league in this season.

First round
This stage scheduled starts on 01 July 2018.

Group A

Group B

Group C

Group D

Group E

Group F

Group G

Group H

Second round
This stage scheduled starts on 18 July 2018.

Group I

Group J

Group K

Group L

Knockout stage

References 

2018 in Indonesian football
Seasons in Asian third tier association football leagues
Liga 3 (Indonesia) seasons
Sport in North Sumatra